Lee Min-ji may refer to:
Lee Min-ji (actress, born 1984)
Lee Min-ji (actress, born 1988)
Lee Min-ji (Miss Korea) (born 1991)
Minjee Lee (born 1996), Australian professional golfer
 Lee Min-ji (weightlifter) (born 1999), South Korean weightlifter